"Poison Arrow" is a song by English new wave band ABC, released as the second single from their debut studio album, The Lexicon of Love (1982).

The single was released in the United Kingdom on 15 February 1982 on 7" and 12", with the same mix appearing on both formats; however a subsequent U.S. 12" remix (also known as the "Jazz Remix") appears on several ABC compilations, and as a bonus track on reissues of The Lexicon of Love.

An alternate, lounge music styled version of this song, entitled "Theme from Mantrap", was released as the B-side of "Poison Arrow" in the United Kingdom, and "The Look of Love" in the United States. The 12" single in the United Kingdom additionally included an instrumental version of "Theme from Mantrap" under the title "Mantrap (The Lounge Sequence)". The band's first hit in the United Kingdom "Tears Are Not Enough" was the B-side of "Poison Arrow" in the United States.

Music video
In the music video, ABC's lead vocalist Martin Fry plays three parts: a haughty upper-class opera patron; a messenger boy at the opera; and a bandleader at a 1960s-style swinging nightspot. In all three roles, he unsuccessfully attempts to woo the leading lady, played by Lisa Vanderpump, later of The Real Housewives of Beverly Hills.

In popular culture
 The song was featured in an early 1983 episode of the US daytime soap opera The Young and the Restless. 
 "Poison Arrow" was used in the 2002 video game Grand Theft Auto: Vice City on the fictional radio station Wave 103.
 In February 1998, the song was featured in an episode of Top Gear, in which scenes of the Vauxhall Astra is being driven, with a voice over by presenter Jeremy Clarkson.
It was featured as the title credits song for the BBC White Gold Series in the Episode "The Past Does Not Equal the Future".

Chart performance

Weekly charts

Year-end charts

References

External links
 

1982 singles
1982 songs
ABC (band) songs
Song recordings produced by Trevor Horn
Songs written by Mark White (musician)
Songs written by Stephen Singleton
Songs written by Martin Fry
Music videos directed by Julien Temple
Mercury Records singles
Vertigo Records singles